WCDQ (106.3 FM) is a radio station licensed to Crawfordsville, Indiana, United States.  The station airs a country music format and is currently owned by C.V.L. Broadcasting, Inc. The station's call letters WCDQ were  originally used by an FM station in Sanford, Maine.

History
The station started as WVXI, owned by Xavier University. It was sold to Key Broadcasting of Kentucky in 2000 and was rebranded as "Hot 106.3," playing current hits.

References

External links
WCDQ's website

CDQ
Country radio stations in the United States
Crawfordsville, Indiana